John Dobson and McFadden Parks were once the center of the Chehalis, Washington park system and they were referred to by residents as the "Top-of-the-Hill" parks due to their proximity to one another. They are the two oldest non-athletic parks in Chehalis.  Begun as memorials to well respected Chehalis residents, they are located in the Hillside district above and east of the historic downtown.  Despite the local community continuing to legally use the parks, they are technically closed as the city does not budget for maintenance except for efforts to clear brush to lower the risk of wildfire.

A trail, the Dobson-McFadden, is accessible at the National Register of Historic Places listed Troop 373 and 7373 Scout Lodge. The trail bridges the parks and leads to open views to much of Chehalis, including downtown, and the Newaukum River valley.

John Dobson Park

John Dobson Park was named after a local farmer who became a prominent Chehalis banker. Donated by the Chehalis Land & Timber Company in his name in 1908 after his death, the initial plot was 15.5-acres (6.3 ha) and the park has had various listings of its acreage, reaching up to 26-acres (11 ha) in size. The city officially received the deed to the park in 1924.

Despite repeated plans to cultivate the land into a park by early Chehalis park commissions, the area would be consistently listed for years as "undeveloped" until a reservoir, with a capacity of 1-million gallons, was built on the site in the 1920s. The reservoir would be expanded to 5-million gallons in 1927.  Construction of a community recreational building and playgrounds, including the Troop 373 and 7373 Scout Lodge, was begun in 1937 as part of the Works Progress Administration. A water filtration plant was built on the grounds in 1960.

McFadden Park

McFadden Park began in 1912 as a donation to the city in memory of Obadiah B. McFadden, a Washington Territory Supreme Court judge. The area was rededicated in 1945 by Mr. McFadden's grandson, Winlock Miller, and a plaque presented for the site. The area encompasses 28-acres (11 ha) with views of Mt. Rainier and the Olympic Mountains. The park has been outfitted and improved over the years with a covered kitchen, picnic areas, trails, and playgrounds. Various improvements to the site took place in the early 1960s with the construction of a main "rim road" and a water filtration plant for the city. A combination of vandalism, location, and newer recreational areas in Chehalis led to the park being considered closed by the city in the late 1980s. Several antenna towers dominate over the site.

See also
 Parks and recreation in Chehalis, Washington

Notes

References 

Parks in Lewis County, Washington
Hiking trails in Washington (state)
Chehalis, Washington